Stomatobaculum is an anaerobic bacterial genus from the family of Lachnospiraceae with one known species (Stomatobaculum longum). Stomatobaculum longum has been isolated from the human dental plaque.

References

Lachnospiraceae
Monotypic bacteria genera
Bacteria genera